Niels Christian Geelmuyden (born 18 December 1960) is a Norwegian journalist and writer, mostly known for his interviews and essays.

Geelmuyden grew up in Lysaker and attended local schools before getting a degree in political science at the University of Oslo. With his critical books about the food industry he has reached a wide audience and really put the topic to debate. 
In 2007 he received the Fritt Ord Honorary Award.

References

1960 births
Living people
Norwegian male writers
Riksmål-language writers
University of Oslo alumni